Battle of Tucson or Capture of Tucson may refer to:
 First Battle of Tucson, December 6, 1779, during the Apache–Mexico Wars
 Second Battle of Tucson, May 1, 1782, during the Apache–Mexico Wars
 Third Battle of Tucson (1782), December 25, 1782, during the Apache–Mexico Wars
 Fourth Battle of Tucson, 21 March, 1784, during the Apache–Mexico Wars
 Capture of Tucson (1846), during the Mexican–American War
 Capture of Tucson (1862), during the American Civil War